The 1999 Rose City Grand Prix was the fifth round of the 1999 American Le Mans Series season.  It took place at Portland International Raceway, Oregon, on August 1, 1999.

Race results
Class winners in bold.

† - #18 Manthey Racing was found to be in violation of PSCR regulations in post-race inspection, the car being below the minimum legal ride height. Manthey Racing and their drivers were penalized by not winning championship points in this round.

Statistics
 Pole position - #42 BMW Motorsport - 1:04.387
 Fastest lap - #42 BMW Motorsport - 1:05.451
 Distance - 
 Average speed -

References

Rose City
Portland Grand Prix
Rose City Grand Prix
1999 in Portland, Oregon
August 1999 sports events in the United States